Agnes Mathew Marwa (born December 24, 1978) is a Tanzanian politician and a member of the Chama Cha Mapinduzi political party. She was elected MP to fill in the Special Seats position in 2015.

References 

1978 births
Living people
Chama Cha Mapinduzi politicians
Tanzanian MPs 2015–2020
Tanzanian MPs 2020–2025